Toro Toro (or Torotoro) is a town in the Charcas Province, Potosí Department, Bolivia.

Torotoro was founded in the late colonial period by mestizo migrants from Cochabamba and legally confirmed as a municipality (municipio) on 21 November 1883. The municipality has an area of 1,169 km² and a population of 10,535 (2001).

Torotoro lies at an altitude of 2,676 m. It can only be reached by gravel roads from Estancia Sucusuma at the Río Caine. The town is at the centre of Torotoro National Park. It is 140 km south of Cochabamba.

Populated places in Potosí Department